Salvation Fire in the Gila National Forest of southwestern New Mexico burned some 26,000 acres (105 km2) from 27 June to 2 July 1974.  It was started by lightning along with some 300 other wildfires, but was one of the last to be contained due to the rugged terrain. 

The fire was located some 60 miles north of Silver City and 24 miles east-southeast of Reserve.  In addition to local fire-fighting crews, crews came from as far away as Montana.  In addition several U.S. Army units were dispatched to help contain the blaze.  

The fire received its name from the Forest Service, since it originated near Salvation Peak.

Notes

References
 "Optimistic About Winning Battle Against Forest Fires" The Bryan Times 2 July 1974, p. 3, col. 2
 "Gila Forest Fire Nearly Controlled" Las Cruces Sun-News 2 July 1974, Vol. 94, No.80,  p. 1, col. 2-7
 "Huge Blaze Raging in Gila Forest" Silver City Daily Press 29 June 1974, p. 1
 Swetnam, Thomas W. (1983) Fire History of the Gila Wilderness, New Mexico Masters Thesis, University of Arizona, Tucson, 

Catron County, New Mexico
Wildfires in New Mexico
1974 in New Mexico
1974 wildfires
1970s wildfires in the United States
1974 fires in the United States